is a Japanese decorative technique used for Buddhist statues and paintings, using gold leaf, silver leaf, or platinum leaf cut into lines, diamonds, and triangles.

History
 was imported from China during the Tang dynasty (618–907). The oldest example is Tamamushi Shrine at Hōryū-ji.  flourished primarily in the 11th century and continued until the 13th or 14th century. After that, however,  almost disappeared, due to the overall decline of Buddhist art.

Technique
Two pieces of leaf (gold or silver, platinum) are heated over an ash-banked fire and bonded together. An additional bonding is then done to further strengthen the leaf and add thickness. Next, the bonded leaf is cut with a bamboo knife on a deer-skin-covered table, then affixed with glue (seaweed glue,  and  glue, etc.) to the object to be decorated.

See also
 Eri Sayoko, Living National Treasure for

References

Bibliography
Sayoko Eri Kirikane World -Brilliance and Romance of Gold Leaf - ISBN

External links

Heian Bussho (平安佛所)

Buddhist art
Japanese crafts
Japanese art terminology
Japanese words and phrases